Coconut Telegraph is the tenth studio album by American popular music singer-songwriter Jimmy Buffett. It was released in February 1981 as MCA 5169 and was produced by Norbert Putnam.

Songs
In addition to songs written or co-written by Buffett (including one with J.D. Souther), the album includes the 1934 jazz standard "Stars Fell on Alabama" penned by Mitchell Parish and Frank Perkins and "It's My Job" written by Mac McAnally, the beginning of a long-term collaboration that would lead to McAnally becoming a member of Buffett's Coral Reefer Band.

Chart performance
Coconut Telegraph reached No. 30 on the Billboard 200 album chart. The song "It's My Job" hit No. 57 on the Billboard Hot 100 singles and would be Buffett's last appearance on that chart for over 20 years until his 2003 duet with Alan Jackson, "It's Five O'Clock Somewhere."

Track listing
Side 1:
"Coconut Telegraph" (Jimmy Buffett) – 2:57
"Incommunicado" (Jimmy Buffett, Deborah McColl, M.L. Benoit) – 3:39
"It's My Job" (Mac McAnally) – 3:10
"Growing Older But Not Up" (Jimmy Buffett) – 3:23
"The Good Fight" (Jimmy Buffett, J.D. Souther) – 3:25

Side 2:
"The Weather is Here, Wish You Were Beautiful" (Jimmy Buffett) – 4:06
"Stars Fell on Alabama" (Mitchell Parish, Frank Perkins) – 4:12
"Island" (Jimmy Buffett, David Loggins) – 3:54
"Little Miss Magic" (Jimmy Buffett) – 4:00

Personnel
The Coral Reefer Band:
Jimmy Buffett – vocals, acoustic guitar
Barry Chance – electric guitar
Josh Leo – electric guitar
Andy McMahon – organ, Fender Rhodes
Harry Dailey – bass, background vocals
Matt Betton – drums
M.L. Benoit – congas and percussion, background vocals
Greg "Fingers" Taylor – harmonica
Michael Utley – organ
David Briggs – piano
Mac McAnally – background vocals on "It's My Job"
J.D. Souther – co-lead vocals on "The Good Fight", background vocals on "It's My Job"
Dr. Kino Bachellier – Shakers and French
Freddie Buffett – background vocals
Norbert Putnam – upright bass
Dominic Cortese – accordion
Deborah McColl – background vocals

Singles
"It's My Job" b/w "Little Miss Magic" (Released on MCA 51061 in January 1981; his only Hot 100 single of the 80s, peaking at #57)
"Stars Fell on Alabama" b/w "Growing Older But Not Up" (Released on MCA 51105 in April 1981)

Notes

Jimmy Buffett albums
1981 albums
Albums produced by Norbert Putnam
Albums recorded at Muscle Shoals Sound Studio
MCA Records albums